United States v. Winstar Corp., 518 U.S. 839 (1996), was a decision by the United States Supreme Court which held that the United States Government had breached its contractual obligations. The court in Winstar rejected the Government's "unmistakability defense"—that surrenders of sovereign authority, such as the promise to refrain from regulatory changes, must appear in unmistakable terms in a contract in order to be enforceable.

Winstar arose as a consequence of the savings and loan crisis. Federal regulators had allowed "supervisory goodwill" to be counted as regulatory capital for financial institutions that took over failing thrifts.  Congress later passed the Financial Institutions Reform, Recovery, and Enforcement Act of 1989, which substantially changed these advantages and one of the successor banks successfully sued. The United States Court of Appeals for the Federal Circuit found a breach of contract and awarded damages—the Supreme Court upheld the lower court decision.  "Winstar" cases resulted in multimillion-dollar payouts to plaintiffs. As of July 31, 2000, there were 13 settlements or judgments totaling $1.158 billion against the federal government, with more than 100 more cases pending, as a result of the Winstar decision.
 
Winstar Corporation and its subsidiary United Federal Savings Bank was successfully represented by Charles J. Cooper.  The board of United Federal Savings Bank consisted of chairman E. Ted Yoch, and directors Kenneth Bureau, Howard Rekstad, Gary Nordness, and William Bartolic.  The decision makes clear that the Stipulation and Consent to Issuance of Order of Prohibition against United's board was improperly required by the Government.

See also
 List of United States Supreme Court cases, volume 518
 List of United States Supreme Court cases
 Lists of United States Supreme Court cases by volume
 Savings and loan crisis

References

Further reading

External links
 

United States Supreme Court cases
United States Supreme Court cases of the Rehnquist Court
Savings and loan crisis
United States banking case law
1996 in United States case law